is a railway station located in the city of  Sakata, Yamagata Prefecture, Japan, operated by the East Japan Railway Company (JR East).

Lines
Higashi Sakata Station is served by the Uetsu Main Line and is located 163.7 rail kilometers from the starting point of that line at Niitsu Station. Trains of the Rikuu West Line also continue past the nominal terminus of that line at Amarume Station towards , stopping at this station en route.

Station layout
The station has two opposed side platforms connected by a footbridge. The station is unattended.

Platforms

History
It has been unattended since September 1972. With the privatization of the JNR on April 1, 1987, the station came under the control of the East Japan Railway Company.

Surrounding area
The station is located in a rural area surrounded by rice paddies.

See also
List of railway stations in Japan

External links

 JR East Station information 

Railway stations in Yamagata Prefecture
Rikuu West Line
Uetsu Main Line
Railway stations in Japan opened in 1958
Sakata, Yamagata